John Nicholas Maronde (born September 5, 1989) is an American former professional baseball pitcher. He played in Major League Baseball (MLB) for the Los Angeles Angels of Anaheim.

Career

Amateur
Maronde went to Lexington Catholic High School in Lexington, KY, where he won a state championship in his sophomore year.  After his senior year in high school, he was drafted by the Oakland Athletics in the 43rd round (1294th overall) of the 2008 Major League Baseball Draft, but he did not sign, opting instead to attend college. He attended the University of Florida, where he played for the Florida Gators baseball team. He appeared in two College World Series, and in his junior season, his team lost in the final game. In 2010, he played collegiate summer baseball with the Falmouth Commodores of the Cape Cod Baseball League.

Los Angeles Angels
Maronde was drafted by the Los Angeles Angels of Anaheim in the 3rd round (104th overall) of the 2011 Major League Baseball Draft  after his junior season, and he elected to forgo his senior season.  He was playing in Double-A for the Arkansas Travelers in the Angels' minor league system before being called up to the Major Leagues on September 1, 2012.

Maronde made his major league debut on September 2, 2012 against the Seattle Mariners. He faced only one batter and had his first major league strikeout on three pitches. Three days later against the Oakland Athletics, he struck out all three batters that he faced in an inning pitched.

Maronde started the 2013 season back with the Double-A Arkansas Travelers, and was recalled by the Angels on July 29.

Cleveland Indians
Maronde was designated for assignment on July 10, 2014. Two days later, the Angels traded Maronde to the Cleveland Indians in exchange for cash considerations.

Miami Marlins
At the 2016 Winter Meetings, the Miami Marlins selected Maronde from the Indians in the minor league phase of the Rule 5 draft. He was released on March 29, 2017.

See also
Rule 5 draft results

References

External links

1989 births
Living people
Baseball players from Lexington, Kentucky
Major League Baseball pitchers
Los Angeles Angels players
Florida Gators baseball players
Falmouth Commodores players
Orem Owlz players
Arizona League Angels players
Inland Empire 66ers of San Bernardino players
Arkansas Travelers players
Lexington Catholic High School alumni
Peoria Javelinas players
Salt Lake Bees players
Mahoning Valley Scrappers players
Akron RubberDucks players
Columbus Clippers players